Thomas Holbein (born March 6, 1983 in Belfort) is a French professional footballer, who currently plays in the Championnat de France amateur 2 for AS Illzach Modenheim.

Career
Holbein played at the professional level in Ligue 2 for Besançon RC and in Serie C2 for A.C. Legnano.

Notes

1983 births
Living people
French footballers
French expatriate footballers
Expatriate footballers in Italy
Ligue 2 players
Racing Besançon players
A.C. Legnano players
FC Mulhouse players
AS Illzach Modenheim players
Association football defenders